James Birrell Mackay (19 December 1943, in Scotland – 11 December 1998) was a Scottish-born Australian association football player.
He was a member of the Australian 1974 World Cup squad in West Germany.

In late 1973, he scored the decisive goal against South Korea which sent Australia to its first ever World Cup. Socceroos defender Doug Utjesenovic described the goal emphatically, "that was one of the freakiest goals. You could try a million times to score the exact goal (and never do it). There was a free kick, the ball was knocked back and he ran onto the ball. It was a real thunderbolt."

Mackay died of a heart attack in 1998.

References

1943 births
1998 deaths
Australian soccer players
Australia international soccer players
1974 FIFA World Cup players
National Soccer League (Australia) players
South Melbourne FC players
Melbourne Knights FC players
Airdrieonians F.C. (1878) players
Bonnyrigg Rose Athletic F.C. players
Scottish footballers
Scottish emigrants to Australia
Association football midfielders